Edward Talley was a Welsh Anglican priest in the late 16th and early 17th centuries.

A Cistercian, Talley was educated at  the University of Oxford. He held livings at Llangathen and Eglwyscummin.  Langford was appointed Archdeacon of Cardigan in 1554.

Notes

16th-century Welsh Anglican priests
Archdeacons of Cardigan
Alumni of the University of Oxford
Welsh Cistercians
17th-century Welsh Anglican priests